The women’s 400 metres at the 2018 World Para Athletics European Championships was held at the Friedrich-Ludwig-Jahn-Sportpark in Berlin from 20–26 August. RaceRunning events (running events involving adapted tricycle frames for athletes with severe balance difficulties) were included for the first time as RR1 and RR3 events. 9 classification finals are held in all over this distance.

Medalists

See also
List of IPC world records in athletics

References

400 metres
2018 in women's athletics
400 metres at the World Para Athletics European Championships